Paragalerhinus is an extinct genus of Gorgonopsia. It was first named by Sigogneau in 1970, and contains one species, P. rubidgei.

See also
 List of therapsids

Sources

 paleodb.org
 www.paleofile.com - Alphabetical list, Section P.

Gorgonopsia
Prehistoric therapsid genera
Permian synapsids of Africa
Fossil taxa described in 1970